Halosaccion is a genus of red algae belonging to the family Palmariaceae.

The species of this genus are found in Northern Hemisphere.

Species
Species:

Halosaccion americanum
Halosaccion glandiforme 
Halosaccion hydrophora 
Halosaccion pubescens 
Halosaccion saccatum
Halosaccion tilesi

References

Florideophyceae
Red algae genera